Wanda B. Cornelius is a Republican politician from the U.S. state of Kentucky.

Cornelius, the wife of the physician Lewis Wayne Cornelius, won a seat on the nonpartisan Taylor County Board of Education, based in Campbellsville.

In 1999, Cornelius was the Republican nominee for Lieutenant Governor of Kentucky. Cornelius and her gubernatorial running mate, Peppy Martin, lost the 1999 general election to incumbent Democratic Governor Paul E. Patton and his running mate, Steve Henry.  Martin and Cornelius polled 128,788 votes (22.2 percent) to Patton and Henry's 352,099 votes (60.6 percent). The remainder of the ballots were cast for the Reform Party gubernatorial nominee Gatewood Galbraith, a perennial candidate in Kentucky elections.

References

Kentucky Republicans
Women in Kentucky politics
Living people
People from Taylor County, Kentucky
School board members in Kentucky
Year of birth missing (living people)
21st-century American women